John 'Jack' Baker (1916-2007) was a British stained-glass artist, teacher, conservator and author.

Biography 
He was a student at the Central School of Arts and Crafts in the late 1930s, where he was a contemporary of Monica Walker and the artist, illustrator and children's author Hilary Stebbing, whom he married in 1946. He worked under James Hogan at the Whitefriars Glass before joining Samuel Caldwell junior at Canterbury Cathedral in 1948 to help reinstate the medieval glass removed for safekeeping during the Second World War.

Teaching
Baker taught stained glass at the Central School of Arts and Crafts from 1951, where in 1953-54 he ran the stained glass department with Tom Fair, and his pupils included Margaret Traherne. From 1963 he taught at Kingston College of Art.

Stained glass windows
 Canterbury Cathedral - St Stephen's Chapel, in memory of Lang Fisk-Moore, Canterbury
 Holy Cross Church, Gleadless Valley - ten large concrete and glass windows, including full height windows of the Virgin Mary and St John
 St Anne's, East Wittering - eighteen windows
 Church of the Holy Name, Bow Common Lane, Mile End
 Little St Peter, Cricklewood - two windows and a brick sculpture
 Broomfield Chapel, Abbots Langley  - two large abstract windows 
 Chapel, St Michaels Convent, Finchley - twenty-two glass windows 
 St George, Britwell - Tree of Jesse
 Holy Trinity Cathedral, Auckland, New Zealand
 St Mary, Ide Hill, Sevenoaks - Nativity, east window
 The King's School, Canterbury - library
 St Mary's, Climping - a stylised Madonna and child
 Burgher's Chapel, Sheffield Cathedral
 Our Lady of Walsingham, London Colney

Publications
 English Stained Glass with an introduction by Herbert Read and photographs by Alfred Lammer, Thames & Hudson, London, 1960
 English Stained Glass of the Medieval Period (revised edition of the above), ..... , 1978

References 
  

1916 births
2007 deaths
People from Birmingham, West Midlands
20th-century British artists
Alumni of the Central School of Art and Design